Camberley railway station is in the town of Camberley in Surrey, England. The station, and all trains serving it, are operated by South Western Railway. Opened in 1878 by the London and South Western Railway (when it was known as Camberley & York Town), the station gained a second platform fifteen years later when the line through here was doubled. The route was electrified (on the third rail system at 650 volts DC) by the Southern Railway on 1 January 1939.

The station was completely rebuilt in 1975.

Services
Camberley is served by trains between Ascot and Aldershot; these operate every 30 minutes Monday to Saturday, and on Sundays, services run between Ascot and Guildford.  On Mondays to Fridays, there are three trains per day that continue beyond Ascot to London Waterloo in the morning peak period, and two from London in the evening. At other times, passengers are required to change at either Ascot or Ash Vale to reach London.

Services are run using a four carriage Class 450. Two bicycles can be carried per train.

Notes

References

 Body, G. (1984), PSL Field Guides - Railways of the Southern Region, Patrick Stephens Ltd, Cambridge.

External links 

Railway stations in Surrey
DfT Category D stations
Former London and South Western Railway stations
Railway stations in Great Britain opened in 1878
Railway stations served by South Western Railway
Camberley